Liberal, Kansas is a center of media in southwestern Kansas. The following is a list of media outlets based in the city.

Print

Newspapers
Crusader, bi-weekly, the Seward County Community College student newspaper
El Lider, weekly
Leader & Times, daily
Liberal Light, weekly

Radio
The following radio stations are licensed to and/or broadcast from Liberal:

AM

FM

Television
Liberal is in the Wichita-Hutchinson, Kansas television market.

The following television stations are licensed to and/or broadcast from Liberal:

References

Mass media in Kansas
Liberal, Kansas